Black Rams Tokyo (formerly Ricoh Black Rams) is a Japanese rugby union team in the Japan Rugby League One. Placed 10th in the 2004-2005 season which meant it had to win a play-off against one of the top regional teams to stay in the league, as it did.

Slogan for 2006 season: TAFU ("Tough" in English). The acronym stands for Team, Aggression, Faith, Unity.

In January 2008 it was announced that Stephen Larkham will be joining the team next season, but the team was relegated back to the Japan East League where Larkham will begin his career in Japan. In April 2008 Todd Louden was announced as head coach, to be assisted by Pote Human (Daily Yomiuri, April 26, 2008).

The team rebranded as Black Rams Tokyo following the rebranding of the Top League to the Japan Rugby League One ahead of 2022.

Schedule/Results

2005

February 13. Ricoh Black Rams v Toyota Jido Shokki - placed third in the Top League Challenge Series.

Players

Current squad

The Black Rams Tokyo squad for the 2023 season is:

Former
 Glen Osborne - Fullback
 Inoke Afeaki - Lock
 Eroni Clarke - Centre
 James Haskell - Loose Forward 
 Ma'a Nonu - Centre
 Stephen Larkham - Fly Half
 Sui Liaga - Wing
 Dean Hall - Wing
 Glenn Paterson - Fly Half
 Michael Broadhurst - Loose Forward

Coaches

Tim Lane (2005-6 season)

References

External links 
Ricoh Black Rams - official site
Ricoh unveils Larkham - Daily Yomiuri, February 14, 2008
Official Site - Official site

Japan Rugby League One teams
Rugby clubs established in 1953
Sports teams in Tokyo
Rugby in Kantō
1953 establishments in Japan